The 2004 United States Senate election in Connecticut took place on November 2, 2004, alongside other elections to the United States Senate in other states as well as elections to the United States House of Representatives and various state and local elections. Incumbent Democrat U.S. Senator Chris Dodd won re-election for a fifth term.

Major candidates

Democratic
Chris Dodd, incumbent U.S. Senator since 1981

Republican
Jack Orchulli, CEO and Co-Founder of a Michael Kors's apparel company

General election

Campaign
Incumbent Chris Dodd was one of the most powerful senators in congress. In the election cycle, Dodd raised over $7 million. His top five contributors were Bear Stearns, Citigroup, National Westminster Bank, Lehman Brothers, and Goldman Sachs.

Republican nominee, Jack Orchulli, ran as fiscal conservative and social moderate. He broke ranks with his party on gay marriage and abortion. That put him on the same side as most voters in the blue state of Connecticut. He often talked about a "broken education system." He argued that Dodd hasn't done anything in his 30 years in congress to fix such issues as traffic problems in Fairfield County.

Orchulli launched a statewide TV ad campaign in September, as he spent over $1.1 million and pledged to spend "whatever it takes" if polls show he is gaining ground on Dodd.

Predictions

Results

See also 
 2004 United States Senate elections

References

2004 Connecticut elections
2004
Connecticut
Chris Dodd